Montenegro is a member state of several international organizations (intergovernmental organizations):

International organizations
United Nations (UN)
International Criminal Police Organization (Interpol), security
International Criminal Court (ICC), international tribunal
World Customs Organization (WCO), trade
North Atlantic Treaty Organization (NATO)
European Border and Coast Guard Agency (FRONTEX)
Council of Europe (CoE)
Organization for Security and Co-operation in Europe (OSCE)
Central European Free Trade Agreement (CEFTA), trade agreement between non-EU countries
Berlin Process, EU enlargement diplomatic initiative
Union for the Mediterranean (UfM), intergovernmental
Central European Initiative (CEI), forum of regional cooperation
Regional Cooperation Council (RCC), forum of regional cooperation
South-East European Cooperation Process (SEECP), forum of regional cooperation
Southeast European Cooperative Initiative (SECI), security

Future
European Union (EU), candidate, in negotiating process

Foreign relations of Montenegro
Politics of Montenegro
Political organisations based in Montenegro
Membership in intergovernmental organizations by state